Joseph Nane Fils Eone (born March 12, 1987 in Yaoundé) is a Cameroonian footballer, who plays for Oakland Roots in the USL Championship.

Career

College and Amateur
Joseph attended the Catholic University of Cameroon prior to coming to the United States to play college soccer at Old Dominion University in 2006. He was a Second Team All-CAA selection in his junior year in 2008.

During his college years he also played with the Hampton Roads Piranhas in the USL Premier Development League.

Professional
Joseph was drafted in the fourth round (53rd overall) of the 2010 MLS SuperDraft by Toronto FC. Joseph signed a developmental contract with Toronto FC on April 5, 2010.

Joseph made his professional debut on April 10, 2010 in a game against New England Revolution.

Joseph was traded to Colorado Rapids on November 30, 2010 in exchange for a third-round selection in the 2012 MLS SuperDraft.

Nane was released by Colorado on November 16, 2012. He entered the 2012 MLS Re-Entry Draft and became a free agent after going undrafted in both rounds of the draft.

On March 12, 2013, Nane signed with New York Cosmos, and made 10 appearances and five starts in his first season with the team, which culminated in winning the 2013 NASL Soccer Bowl over Atlanta Silverbacks. The Cosmos announced on January 25, 2014 that they had signed Nane to a contract extension.

During the 2014 Spring season, Nane made eight appearances and six starts and recorded his first assist with the Cosmos in the team's 3-0 win over the Fort Lauderdale Strikers on May 31, 2014 at Fort Lauderdale, as the Cosmos finished in second place with a record of 6-1-2 (W-D-L).

Nane finished the 2014 regular season with 13 starts and 21 appearances. He recorded one assist on the season. He failed to reach a new contract agreement with New York at the end of 2014 and was released by the club.

Nane spent the 2015 season with San Antonio Scorpions, before the club ceased operations in December 2015.

Kazakhstan
In February 2016 Nane moved to the Kazakhstan Premier League, signing for FC Okzhetpes on a one-year contract. After suffering a recurrence of an old knee injury, Nane was ruled out for three months, subsequently Nane left Okzhetpes by mutual consent on 6 June 2017. The following June, having played an additional six-months with Okzhetpes, Nane signed for FC Aktobe on 18 June 2017. On 28 February 2018, Nane signed for FC Atyrau.

Personal
Nane holds a U.S. green card which qualifies him as a domestic player for MLS roster purposes.

Career statistics

Club

Honours

Club
Toronto FC
Canadian Championship (1): 2010

New York Cosmos
NASL Soccer Bowl (1): 2013

References

External links
 

1987 births
Living people
Cameroonian footballers
Cameroonian expatriate footballers
Virginia Beach Piranhas players
Toronto FC players
Colorado Rapids players
New York Cosmos (2010) players
San Antonio Scorpions players
Old Dominion Monarchs men's soccer players
Old Dominion University alumni
FC Okzhetpes players
ASIL Lysi players
P.O. Xylotymbou players
Oakland Roots SC players
USL League Two players
Major League Soccer players
North American Soccer League players
Kazakhstan Premier League players
Expatriate soccer players in Canada
Expatriate soccer players in the United States
Expatriate footballers in Kazakhstan
Toronto FC draft picks
Cameroonian expatriate sportspeople in the United States
Association football midfielders
Expatriate footballers in Cyprus
Cypriot Second Division players